Halberstadt is a town in the German state of Saxony-Anhalt and the capital of the district of Harz.

It can also refer to:

Places
Several territories centered on the town have used its name:
 Bishopric of Halberstadt, a Roman Catholic diocese and state of the Holy Roman Empire until the Peace of Westphalia
 Principality of Halberstadt, the secularized successor to the Bishopric of Halberstadt after the Peace of Westphalia
 Halberstadt (district), a former district (Kreis) in the middle of Saxony-Anhalt, Germany, merged with other districts in 2007 to form the district of Harz.

People
 Alex Halberstadt (born 1970), American writer
 Amy Halberstadt (born 1954), American psychologist
 Hans Halberstadt (1885–1966), German-born American Olympic fencer
 Haymo of Halberstadt (died 853), German Benedictine monk and author who served as bishop of Halberstadt
 Joseph Allen Halberstadt (born 1988), American drummer
 Milton Halberstadt (1919–2000), American photographer
 Randy Halberstadt (born 1953), American jazz musician
 Scott Halberstadt (born 1976), American film and television actor
 Vitaly Halberstadt (1903-1967), French chess master
 Victor Halberstadt (born 1939), Professor of Public Sector Finance

Aircraft
Halberstädter Flugzeugwerke was a German aircraft manufacturer established in 1912, and dissolved after the end of World War I.  Aircraft made by the company included:
 Halberstadt C.V
 Halberstadt CL.II
 Halberstadt CL.IV
 Halberstadt D.I
 Halberstadt D.II

Sport
 VfB Germania Halberstadt, a German football club located in Halberstadt, which as of the 2011–12 season was playing in Regionalliga Nord